Kwale County is a county in the former Coast Province of Kenya. Its capital is Kwale, although Ukunda is the largest town.

Kwale county has an estimated population of 649,931.

Kwale is mainly an inland county, but it has coastline south of Mombasa. Diani Beach is part of the Msambweni division. Shimba Hills National Reserve and Mwaluganje elephant sanctuary are other attractions in the county.

Distribution and demographics 
The main ethnic communities in the county include the Digo and Duruma clans of the larger Mijikenda tribe and also a significant presence of the Kamba tribe.

The Digos are the majority in Msambweni, Lunga Lunga and Matuga while the Durumas are the dominant in Kinango. Most Kambas are found in Kinango, Matuga and Lunga Lunga with a significant population in Msambweni.

The county has four constituencies:
 Msambweni Constituency
 Matuga Constituency
 Kinango Constituency
 Lunga Lunga Constituency

Samburu should not be confused with Samburu County.

Religion 
As of 2019, there were 43,624 Catholics, 116,453 Protestants, 82,176 Evangelicals, 70,805 other Christians; 520,160 Moslems, 332 Hindus, 7,121 Traditionals; 4,703 from other religions and 12,551 who have no religion.

Towns and settlements 

Bazo
Bwaga Cheti
Chingwede
Dololo
Dundani
Dzirive
Golini
Jambole
Jego
Kwale
Livundoni
Lungalunga
Msambweni
Ufumbani
Ukunda
Vikinduni
Wasin
Majoreni

Geography

Topographic features 
The coastline in Kwale County stretches for roughly 250 kilometres, which consists of corals, sands and alluvial deposits.

The Coastal Plain, the Foot Plateau, the Coastal Uplands, and the Nyika Plateau are the four principal topographical features of Kwale County.

The Coastal Plain is famous for its white sand beaches. These land formations is a made up of eroded reef material, such as coral sand when it is deposited on the inshore side of the reef. Furthermore, this region has one of the most productive coral reefs, including coral flats, lagoons, reef platforms and fringing reefs. These reefs occupy an estimated total area of 50,000 Ha, with stony coral covering 30%-40% of the total reef population.

Behind the Coastal Plain lies the Foot Plateau at an altitude of 60–135 meters above sea level.

From the Foot Plateau, the Coastal Uplands (also known as "Shimba Hills"), ascends steeply, reaching an altitude of 135–462 meters above the sea level. This geographical area consist of numerous sandstone hills, which include the Shimba Hills (420m), Tsimba (350m), Mrima (323m) and Dzombo (462m).

On the western boundary of the county, the Nyika Plateau (commonly referred to as the "hinterland") gently climbs from roughly 180 meters and covers more than half of the county. A basement rocks system lies beneath the plateau, which also contains random reddish sand soils patches. Since the soil in these regions are semi-arid and low-fertile, livestock rearing became the main activity at the hinterland.

Seven major rivers and numerous minor streams form the county's drainage system. The main rivers and streams are Ramisi, Marere, Pemba, Mkurumuji, Umba, Mwachema and the Mwachi River. Out of these seven rivers, three are permanent (Marere, Mwaluganje, and the Ramisi River). All these rivers flow into the Indian Ocean.

Climate 
The county has a monsoon climate; it is hot and dry from January to April, with the coolest months being June to August.

Rainfall is divided into two seasons: short rains from October to December, and long rains from March to June/July. The county's average temperature is 24.2 °C. In the coastal low lands, temperature ranges from 26.30 °C to 26.60 °C; in Shimba Hills, 25.00 °C to 26.60 °C, and in the hinterland, 24.60 °C to 27.50 °C.

Annual rainfall varies between 400 and 1,680 mm.

Historically, flooding has occurred in Kwale County in the central eastern parts of the county which is caused by intense rains. Climate experts and farmers have seen a significant change of climate conditions which have greatly affected agriculture production and the livelihood of the people of Kwale County. Significant increase of heat has led to frequency of drought in the county.

Agriculture 
The county has a potential to feed its population and even export food to neighboring counties but Kwale County has faced food insecurity caused by low productivity and only 30% of the population in both  urban and rural areas are secure with food. some of the reasons for food insecurity in Kwale County include:

 Lack of access to farm inputs such as plants and animals genetic improved materials.
 Pests and Vector control solutions including machinery.
 Lack of available and  affordable high quality plant and livestock breeds, husbandry services.

These have led to the farmers in the county to use poor quality of seeds while pests and diseases becomes a threat to production of agriculture inputs.

Beans, cassava, maize, peas, grams and semi-commercial crops, like coconuts and mangoes, are the majority of crops grown in Kwale County.

Cashew nuts, sugarcane, cotton, simsim, bixa and tobacco are cultivated as cash crops.

On the 17th of December (Friday), 2021, the Kwale County opened a Sh130 million wholesale fresh produce market at Kombani, which was co-funded by the European Union and the county government, hoping to ease the selling of farmers’ produce and promote trading activities. The new market also ranks largest, after the Kongowea market in Mombasa, in the coastal area.

Animal Farming 
The Nyika Plateau, which receives rainfall of less than 700mm, relies heavily on livestock farming. About two-thirds of the county is covered by the hinterland.

According to the 2009 Census, there were 255,143 cattle, 349,755 goats, 83,133 sheep, and 433,827 indigenous chickens in the livestock population. Zebu and Boran cattle are the most common beef breeds, while Crosses of Ayrshire and Sahiwal cattle are the most common type for dairy.

Despite the large number of livestock, production has remained low due to poor-quality breeds, inadequate husbandry, and high pest and disease occurrences.

Livestock Off-Take Program 
In November 2021, the Kenya Red Cross Society began the Livestock Off-take and Cash Transfer initiatives in Kwale County to help livestock farmers avoid severe losses during the drought season.

The livestock offtake programme includes purchasing, killing, and distributing livestock meat to local inhabitants.

Mohammed Mwainzi, the Kwale County Coordinator for the Kenya Red Cross Society, said the off-take programme aims to reduce livestock deaths during the dry season and empower livestock caretakers to withstand the ravages of drought and famine.

The price of each cow is between Sh 5,000 and Sh 6,000.

The Kenyian government also launched a Sh40 million Livestock Off-take Programme in Kwale County as a response to reduce loss of animals to drought. Government Spokesperson Colonel (Rtd) Cyrus Oguna said 26,000 people in Kwale who have been affected by drought will get a monthly stipend of Sh3,000 via mobile money transfer platforms to help cushion and enhance their lives.

Kwale Agribusiness Program

Background 
Since 2014, Australian-based Business for Development (B4D) has partnered with ASX-listed Base Titanium Limited (BTL), a mineral sands producer in Kwale County,  to initiate programs that support local farming communities in their endeavours to improve the returns from their agricultural activities

Together with the Cotton On Group (COG), Australia's largest global retailer, the Government of the Republic of Kenya, and the local Kwale Government, the Kwale Agribusiness Program (KAP) was established.

The program's purpose is to transition smallholder agricultural communities in the region from subsistence farming to more economically focused, and thus more profitable, farming practices. The main products of this program are cotton, grain, pulses, and livestock, including stock feed.

Program Objectives 
The KAP model has demonstrated that industrialisation of the Kenyan cotton sector is attainable through long-term improvements in farming methods, quality control, productivity, and increased profit margin retention by the farming community.

Over the next five years, the primary objective will be to execute the KAP model across Kenya's cotton growing communities. Through the growth and replication of the KAP model across Kenya, the initiative will contribute to the revival of the cotton sector in Kenya. To that end, the following goals have been set.

 Kenyan smallholder farmers will have increased voice, agency, and capacity.
 Farmers have increased resilience through improved food security, nutrition, and diversified income.
 Established partnerships and contractual certainty delivers increased profits for farmers and global buyers and guarantees supply.
 Development of new localised cotton processing capacity will deliver increased national support and export of Kenyan cotton and lint.

PAVI Kwale Farmers' Co-operative 
The society's name is derived from ‘pamba na viazi’, the Swahili words for cotton and potatoes. The development of the PAVI Kwale Farmers' Co-operative has provided additional aid by giving the farmers a united voice in discussions with COG and other customers, suppliers, government, and supportive partners.

Through the Ministry of Agriculture, Livestock and Fisheries (MoALF) and the Kwale County Government, PAVI has been able to obtain technical assistance and additional resources. Both levels of government have expressed a strong desire to assist PAVI's agriculture prospects. A stock mill has been built, and negotiations for the development of a cooperatively operated cotton gin are currently underway.

References 

 
Coast Province
Counties of Kenya